The 2018 Pacific-Asia Curling Championships were held from November 3 to 10 at the Gangneung Curling Centre in Gangneung, South Korea. The top two men's and women's teams qualified for the 2019 World Men's Curling Championship and 2019 World Women's Curling Championship respectively. The third and fourth-placed teams qualified for the World Qualification Event, a chance to qualify for the World Curling Championships.

Men

Teams

Round-robin standings

Round-robin results

All draw times are listed in Korean Standard Time (UTC+09).

Draw 1
Saturday, November 3, 18:30

Draw 2
Sunday, November 4, 09:00

Draw 4
Sunday, November 4, 19:00

Draw 6
Monday, November 5, 14:00

Draw 8
Tuesday, November 6, 08:00

Draw 10
Tuesday, November 6, 16:00

Draw 12
Wednesday, November 7, 09:00

Draw 14
Wednesday, November 7, 19:00

Draw 16
Thursday, November 8, 14:00

Playoffs

Semifinals
Friday, November 9, 09:00

Friday, November 9, 19:00

Bronze medal game
Saturday, November 10, 08:30

Gold medal game
Saturday, November 10, 16:30

Women

Teams

{| class="wikitable"
|-
!width=200|
!width=200|
!width=200|
!width=200|
|-
|
Skip: Tahli Gill
Third: Laurie Weeden
Second: Lynette Gill
Lead: Kirby Gill
Alternate: Jayna Gill
|
Fourth: Jiang Yilun
Skip: Liu Sijia
Second: Dong Ziqi
Lead: Jiang Xindi
Alternate: Wang Rui
|
Skip: Ling-Yue Hung
Third: Julie Morrison
Second: Ada Shang
Lead: Ashura Wong
Alternate: Grace Bugg
|
Skip: Satsuki Fujisawa
Third: Chinami Yoshida
Second: Yumi Suzuki
Lead: Yurika Yoshida
Alternate: Kotomi Ishizaki
|-
!width=200|
!width=200|
!width=200|
!width=200|
|-
|
Skip: Sitora Alliyarova
Third: Anastassiya Spirikova
Second: Angelina Ebauyer
Lead: Regina Ebauyer
Alternate: Yekaterina Kolykhalova|
Skip: Kim Min-ji
Third: Kim Hye-rin
Second: Yang Tae-i
Lead: Kim Su-jin
|
Skip: Mabarka Al-Abdulla
Third: Lara Shaikhahmed
Second: Sara Al-Qaet
Lead: Amna Al-Qaet
|
|}

Round-robin standings

Round-robin results

All draw times are listed in Korean Standard Time (UTC+09).

Draw 3Sunday, November 4, 14:00Draw 5Monday, November 5, 09:00Draw 7Monday, November 5, 19:00Draw 9Tuesday, November 6, 12:00Draw 11Tuesday, November 6, 20:00Draw 13Wednesday, November 7, 14:00Draw 15Thursday, November 8, 09:00Playoffs

SemifinalsThursday, November 8, 19:00Friday, November 9, 14:00Bronze medal gameSaturday, November 10, 08:30Gold medal gameSaturday, November 10, 12:30''

References

External links

Pacific-Asia Curling Championships
Pacific-Asia
Pacific-Asia Curling Championships
Pacific-Asia Curling
International curling competitions hosted by South Korea
Sports competitions in Gangneung